Dahandeh (also known as Dowhāndeh and Dowhondeh) is a village in Kasma Rural District, in the Central District of Sowme'eh Sara County, Gilan Province, Iran. At the 2006 census, its population was 323, in 105 families.

References 

Populated places in Sowme'eh Sara County